Sergiu Sîrbu may refer to:

Sergiu Sîrbu1 (born 1960), Moldovan football manager; ex-footballer
Sergiu Sîrbu1 (born 1986), Moldovan footballer
Sergiu Sîrbu1 (born 1980), Moldovan politician, deputy in Moldovan Parliament between 2010 and 2014

Notes
1. ^ All three persons with name Sergiu Sîrbu, can figure in some sources as "Serghei Sîrbu", because they were born in Soviet period in Moldovan SSR, and their names were russified. Also, they can figure in some sources with romanised surname Sârbu.

See also
Sârbu/Sîrbu